The Vern River is a  stream in northern Minnesota, the United States. It is a tributary of the Temperance River and flows entirely within the Boundary Waters Canoe Area Wilderness of Superior National Forest.

See also
List of rivers of Minnesota

References

External links
Minnesota Watersheds
USGS Hydrologic Unit Map - State of Minnesota (1974)

Rivers of Minnesota
Rivers of Cook County, Minnesota